"For I Have Loved Strangers" was an American television play broadcast on December 19, 1957, as part of the second season of the CBS television series Playhouse 90. Elick Moll wrote the teleplay based on a story by Don Murray and Fred Clasel. Franklin Schaffner directed, Martin Manulis was the producer, and Hedda Hopper hosted. Don Murray and Hope Lange starred. The story was based on Murray's personal experience working with European refugees. Both Murray and Lange donated their salaries from the production to the Homeless European Land Program (HELP) founded by Murray.

Plot
An American is hired to work for a displaced persons camp in Italy. He falls in love with a Czechoslovakian refugee, but he is confronted with obstacles when he decide to marry and bring his bride back to the United States.

Cast
The following performers received screen credit for their performances:

 Don Murray as Bob Munson
 Hope Lange as Raiya
 Robert Flemyng as Dr. Farlo
 Vladimir Sokoloff as Bartok
 Werner Klemperer as Boris

References

1957 television plays
1957 American television episodes
Playhouse 90 (season 2) episodes